Gar Run is a  long 3rd order tributary to Brokenstraw Creek.  It is classed as a cold-water fishery by the Pennsylvania Fish and Boat Commission.

Variant names
According to the Geographic Names Information System, it has also been known historically as:  
Crouse Run

Course
Gar Run rises on the divide between it and Oil Creek in Warren County, Pennsylvania about 2 miles east of Sanford, Pennsylvania and flows northeast to meet Brokenstraw Creek at Garland.

Watershed
Gar Run drains  of the Pennsylvania High Plateau province and is underlaid by the Venango Formation. The watershed receives an average of 42.6 in/year of precipitation and has a wetness index of 388.06.  The watershed is about 75% forested.

See also 
 List of rivers of Pennsylvania

References

Rivers of Pennsylvania
Tributaries of the Allegheny River
Rivers of Warren County, Pennsylvania